The Sabre 28 is a series of American sailboats, designed by Roger Hewson and first built in 1971.

Production
The boat was built in three versions by Sabre Yachts in the United States between 1971 and 1986, with a total of 588 built.

Design

The Sabre 28 was the first design for the newly-formed company. Its design goal was to build the finest 28-foot sailing yacht available, using the state of the art materials and techniques available at the time and construct the boat on a modern assembly line basis, to realize good economy and production quality. 

The Sabre 28 is a small recreational keelboat, built predominantly of fiberglass, with extensive teak wood trim. It has a masthead sloop rig, a raked stem, vertical transom, skeg-mounted rudder controlled by a ship's wheel and a swept fixed fin keel.

The accommodations include a double "V" berth in the forward cabin, single and double bunks in the main cabin, and a quarter berth. The forward cabin has a door for privacy. The head includes a hanging locker and a dorade vent. The main cabin has a folding table that stows against a bulkhead. The galley features a recessed stove.

The foredeck mounts an anchor locker. Other features include a foredeck hatch, four opening and four fixed ports, internal halyards for both the mainsail and the genoa, raised by a mast-mounted winch. The mainsheet traveler is mounted on the cabin roof and genoa tracks are provided. The genoa is controlled with dual two-speed winches, mounted on the cockpit coaming.

Variants
Sabre 28-1 (serial numbers 1-211)
This model was introduced in 1971 and produced until 1976, with 199 built. Eight were built with ketch rigs. Universal Atomic 4  gasoline engine. The shoal draft version has a PHRF racing average handicap of 201 with a high of 210 and low of 195.
Sabre 28-2 (serial numbers 212-539)
This model was introduced in 1976 and produced until 1982, with 320 built. The boat has a PHRF racing average handicap of 201 with a high of 205 and low of 198.
Sabre 28-3 (serial numbers 540-588)
This model was introduced in 1983 and produced until 1986. The boat has a PHRF racing average handicap of 186 with a high of 189 and low of 183.

American Sailboat Hall of Fame
The Sabre 28 was inducted into the now-defunct Sail America American Sailboat Hall of Fame in 2003. In honoring the design, the hall cited, "If Roger Hewson and his associates at Sabre Yachts hadn’t hit a sweet spot with the 28 – bringing the look and feel of a yacht into the pocket-cruiser size range – they wouldn’t have had a 15-year production run, nor gone on to build close to 2000 larger sail and power boats. Perhaps the truest testimony to their success in crafting a boat of lasting quality is the price a 28 fetches on the used boat market today. Depending on maintenance and updates, prices can range from $15,000 to $30,000. As Hornor writes, “The Sabre 28 is rather high priced for its size and accommodations. However, the boat has proven to be a good investment due to its ability to attract buyers willing to pay a little more”"

See also
List of sailing boat types
Sabre 38

Similar sailboats
Alerion Express 28
Aloha 28
Beneteau First 285
Beneteau Oceanis 281
Bristol Channel Cutter
Cal 28
Catalina 28
Crown 28
Cumulus 28
Grampian 28
Hunter 28
Hunter 28.5
Hunter 280
J/28
Laser 28
O'Day 28
Pearson 28
Sea Sprite 27
Sirius 28
Tanzer 28
Tanzer 8.5
TES 28 Magnam
Viking 28

References

External links

Keelboats
1970s sailboat type designs
Sailing yachts
Sailboat type designs by Roger Hewson
Sailboat types built by Sabre Yachts